The New Nashville Cats is a country album by Mark O'Connor, in conjunction with a variety of other musical artists. O'Connor selected a group of over fifty Nashville musicians, many of whom had worked with him as session musicians. The album was intended to "showcase the instrumental side of the Nashville recording scene" (O'Connor's liner notes). It was awarded two Grammys: Best Country Instrumental Performance for O'Connor, and Best Country Collaboration with Vocals for Vince Gill, Ricky Skaggs, and Steve Wariner's performance in "Restless". This song also charted at #25 on Hot Country Songs in 1991.

Track listing
All songs were composed by Mark O'Connor, except where noted.
"Bowtie" – 2:40
"Restless" (Carl Perkins) – 5:25
"Nashville Shuffle Boogie" – 6:10
"Pick It Apart" – 4:59
"Traveler's Ridge" – 3:35
"Granny White Special" – 3:53
"Cat in the Bag" – 2:43
"The Ballad of Sally Anne" (Traditional; lyrics by Alice Randall, arranged by O'Connor and Harry Stinson) – 2:36
"Swang" – 4:52
"Dance of the Ol' Swamp Rat" – 3:03
"A Bowl of Bula" – 4:05
"Limerock" (Traditional; arranged by O'Connor and Edgar Meyer) – 2:23
"Sweet Suzanne" – 5:12
"Orange Blossom Special" (Ervin T. Rouse) – 5:39
"Now It Belongs to You" (Steve Wariner) – 6:33

Personnel
Sam Bacco - marimba, percussion
Russ Barenberg - acoustic guitar
Eddie Bayers - drums
Mike Brignardello - bass guitar
Dennis Burnside - piano
Sam Bush - mandolin
Larry Byrom - acoustic guitar, electric guitar
Mark Casstevens - acoustic guitar
John Cowan - lead vocals on "The Ballad of Sally Anne"
Jerry Douglas - dobro
Bessyl Duhon - accordion
Béla Fleck - banjo
Paul Franklin - pedal steel guitar
Sonny Garrish - pedal steel guitar
Steve Gibson - electric guitar
Vince Gill - electric guitar and lead vocals on "Restless"
Mike Haynes - trumpet
Jim Horn - alto saxophone, baritone saxophone
David Hungate - bass guitar
Roy Huskey Jr. - upright bass
Carl Jackson - acoustic guitar
John Barlow Jarvis - piano, synthesizer
Jerry Kroon - drums
Mike Lawler - keyboards, synthesizer
Paul Leim - drums
Kenny Malone - percussion
Brent Mason - electric guitar
Bob Mater - drums
Terry McMillan - harmonica, percussion
Edgar Meyer - upright bass
Mark O'Connor - fiddle, mandolin
Larry Paxton - bass guitar
Don Potter - acoustic guitar
Michael Rhodes - bass guitar
Tom Roady - percussion
Matt Rollings - piano, synthesizer
Charles Rose - trombone
Brent Rowan - electric guitar
Mark Schatz - banjo, upright bass
David Schnaufer - Appalachian dulcimer
Gove Scrivenor - autoharp
Randy Scruggs - acoustic guitar
Lisa Silver - background vocals on "Now It Belongs to You"
Ricky Skaggs - electric guitar and lead vocals on "Restless"
Denis Solee - tenor saxophone
Harry Stinson - drums, percussion, background vocals on "The Balled of Sally Ann” and “Now It Belongs to You"
Marty Stuart - mandolin and background vocals on "The Ballad of Sally Anne"
Steve Turner - drums
Billy Joe Walker Jr. - acoustic guitar
Alisa Jones Wall - hammer dulcimer
Steve Wariner - acoustic guitar on “Now It Belongs to You”, electric guitar on "Restless", lead vocals on "Restless" and "Now It Belongs to You"
Roy Wooten - drums
Victor Wooten - bass guitar
Glenn Worf - bass guitar

Chart performance

Notes 

Mark O'Connor albums
1991 albums
Warner Records albums
Albums produced by Jim Ed Norman